Val Murphy coached the Papua New Guinea Kumuls in 1979.

References

Papua New Guinea national rugby league team coaches
Rugby league coaches
Possibly living people
Year of birth missing